The SLFA First Division (previously known as the Gold Division) is the top division of the Saint Lucia Football Association.

Previous winners
1980 : Dames SC (Vieux Fort)
1981 : Uptown Rebels (Vieux Fort)
Unknown champion between 1982 and 1986 (4 titles for VSADC?)
1997 : Pioneers FC (Castries)
1998 : Rovers United (Mabouya Valley) (? – VSADC?)
1999 : Roots Alley Ballers (Vieux Fort)
2000 : Roots Alley Ballers (Vieux Fort)
2001 : VSADC (Castries)
2002 : VSADC (Castries)
2003/04 : Roots Alley Ballers (Vieux Fort)
2004/05 : Northern United (Gros Islet)
2005/06 : Canaries (Canaries)
2006/07 : Anse Chastanet GYSO (Soufrière)
2007/08 : Anse Chastanet GYSO (Soufrière)
2008 : Aux Lyons United (Mabouya Valley)
2009 : Roots Alley Ballers (Vieux Fort)
2010 : Northern United (Gros Islet)
2011 : VSADC (Castries)
2012 : VSADC (Castries)
2013 : Big Players FC (Marchand)
2015 : Young Roots (Vieux Fort)
2016: Survivals (Mabouya Valley)
2017: Northern United (Gros Islet)
2018: Platinum FC
2019: Platinum FC
2020: abandon due to the COVID-19 pandemic
2021: Platinum FC
2022: B1 FC

Top scorers

References

External links
RSSSF.com

 
1
Top level football leagues in the Caribbean
Sports leagues established in 1979
1979 establishments in Saint Lucia